A zhuz (also translated as "horde") is one of the three main territorial and tribal divisions in the Kypchak Plain area that covers much of the contemporary Kazakhstan. It represents the main tribal division within the ethnic group of the Kazakhs.

The  Senior zhuz covers territories of southern and southeastern Kazakhstan, northwestern China (Xinjiang) and parts of Uzbekistan. 
The  Middle zhuz consists of six tribes, covering northern, central and eastern Kazakhstan.
The  Junior zhuz consists of three tribes, covering western Kazakhstan and western Russia (Orenburg Oblast).

History 
The earliest mention of the Kazakh zhuz or hordes dates to the 17th century.
Velyaminov-Zernov (1919) believed that the division arose as a result of the
capture of the important cities of Tashkent, Yasi, and Sayram in 1598.

Some researchers argued that the zhuz in origin corresponded to tribal, military alliances of steppe nomads that emerged around the mid-16th century after the disintegration of the Kazakh Khanate. 
Yuri Zuev argued their territorial division comprises three ecological or topographic zones, the Senior zhuz of the southern and southeastern steppe being set apart from the two other zones by Lake Balkhash.

According to some researchers, Kazakhs was separated in the first civil war in the Kazakh Khanate. Tribes that recognized Buidash Khan formed Senior zhuz. Tribes that recognized Togim Khan formed Middle zhuz. Tribes that recognized Akhmed Khan formed Junior zhuz.

According to Kazakh legends, the three zhuz were the territorial inheritances of the three sons of the legendary founder-ancestor of the Kazakhs. 
In Kazakh language, jüz means either "union" or "hundred".

Senior zhuz 

Historically, the Senior zhuz inhabited the northern lands of the former Chagatai Ulus of the Mongol Empire, in the Ili River and Chu River basins, in today's South-Eastern Kazakhstan and China's Ili Kazakh Autonomous Prefecture (northern Xinjiang). It was also called Üysin jüz.

The first record of the Senior zhuz dates to 1748, due to a Tatar emissary of the Tsaritsa who had been sent to the steppe to negotiate the submission of Abul Khair Khan in 1732. According to Nikolai Aristov, the estimated population of the Senior zhuz was about 550,000 people in the second half of the 19th century. 
The territory was conquered by the Kokand Khanate in the 1820s, and by the Russian Empire during the 1850s to 1860s.

Kazakhstan's ruling elite, including former president Nursultan Nazarbayev, former First Secretary of the Communist Party of Kazakhstan Dinmukhamed Konayev, as well as famous poet Jambyl Jabayev are representatives of the Senior zhuz.
 
There have been several attempts to determine the exact names and nature of top-level clans throughout the 19th and early 20th centuries. However, different studies created vastly different names and population numbers for the steppe clans. Generally accepted names of the first order Senior zhuz tribes or clans are:

 Dulat 
 Janys
 Siyqym
 Botbay
 Shymyr
 Jalayir 
 Qangly
 Alban
 Suwan
 Sary-Uysin
 Shapyrashty
 Sirgeli
 Oshaqty
 Ysty
 Shanyshqyly

Khans 
 Kart-Abulkhayr Khan (1718-1730)
 Zholbarys Khan (1730-1740)
 Abulfeyz Khan (1740-1750)
 Tole Biy (1750-1756)
 Abylai Khan (1756-1771)
 Abilpeyiz Khan (1771-1774)
 Adil Khan (1774-1781)
 Kasym Khan II (1806-1809)
 Tokay Khan (1809-1826)

Middle zhuz 

The Middle zhuz (also known as Arğın Jüz [Арғын Жүз]),  occupies the eastern lands of the former Golden Horde, in central, northern and eastern Kazakhstan.

Some of Kazakhstan's famous poets and intellectuals were born in the Middle zhuz territories, including Abay Qunanbayuli, Akhmet Baytursinuli, Shokan Walikhanuli and Alikhan Bokeikhanov.

The Middle zhuz consists of the following tribes:
Argyn
Kerei
Naiman
Khongirad
Qypchak
Taraqty )
Uwaq

Junior zhuz 

The Junior or Lesser zhuz (also known as Alşın Jüz) occupied the lands of the former Nogai Khanate in Western Kazakhstan.

They originate from the Nogais of the Nogai Horde, which once was placed in Western Kazakhstan, but in the 16th century it was defeated by the Kazakhs and the Russians and Nogais retreated to the Western part of their khanate, to the Kuban River steppes. In the 18th century, they endangered inner Russian cities, so the Russian Empire allied the Mongolic Kalmyks to supplant Alshyns back to the Urals. There they formed the Lesser zhuz. During Kazakh-Kalymk struggles, Khiva Khanate annexed Mangyshlak Peninsula for repelling Kalmyk raids and managed it for two centuries before Russian conquest. At the beginning of the 19th century, Kazakhs shifted some to the west, to Astrakhan Governorate, forming Bukey Horde there. As the Kazakh SSR was formed with Bukey Horde as the most remoted its western part, situated geographically in Europe.

Historical leaders of Kazakh resistance against the Russian Empire associated with the Junior zhuz include Isatay Taymanuly (1791–1838) and Makhambet Otemisuly  (1803/4–1846).

The Junior zhuz consisted of three groups, subdivided into clans:
Baiuly
 Adai
 Alasha
 Baibaqty
 Berish
 Jappas
 Masqar
 Taz
 Tana
 Esentemir
 Ysyq
 Qyzylqurt
 Sherkesh
Alimuly
 Qarakesek
 Qarasaqal
 Tortqara
 Kete
 Shomekei
 Shekti
Jetyru
 Tabyn
 Tama
 Kerderi
 Kerey
 Zhagalbaily
 Telew
 Ramadan

Family in zhuzes 
In zhuzes, a clear purpose of each son in the family is determined. According to the customs and traditions of the Kazakhs, different people were engaged in the upbringing of each son.

 The eldest son went to be raised by his grandparents.
 The youngest son stayed with his parents and subsequently pledged to help the whole family.
 The middle son became a warrior. He was trained in swordsmanship, archery, etc.
Knowledge of one's genealogical tree is the duty of each member of the zhuz. Any relative who comes for help (even the most distant one) will definitely receive it.

See also
Kazakh Khanate
Zhetysu
Ethnic demography of Kazakhstan
List of medieval Mongolian tribes and clans
Orda (structure)

References

Literature 
Svat Soucek, "A History of Inner Asia". Cambridge University Press (2000). .
W. W. Bartold, Four studies in history of Central Asia, Leiden: E.J. Brill, 1962.
Ilkhamov Alisher et al., "Ethnic Atlas of Uzbekistan", Uzbekistan, "Open Society Foundation", 2002, p. 176,  
Isin A., "Kazakh khanate and Nogai Horde in the second half of the 15th - 16th centuries", Semipalatinsk, Tengri, 2002, p. 22,   
 S. Qudayberdiuli. "Family tree of Turks, Kirgizes, Kazakhs and their Khan dynasties", Alma-Ata, Dastan, 1990 
 S. Kudayberdy-Uly, Family tree of Türks, Kyrgyz, Kazakhs and their Khan dynasties, Alma-Ata, Dastan, 1990  
M. Tynyshbaev, 'The Uysyn', in Materials on the history of the Kazakh people, Tashkent 1925 
Yu.A. Zuev, "Ethnic History of the Usuns", Works of the Academy of Sciences of the Kazakh SSR, History, Archeology And Ethnography Institute, Alma-Ata, Vol. 8, 1960. 
 А. Т. Толеубаев, Ж. К. Касымбаев, М. К. Койгелдиниев, Е. Т. Калиева, Т. Т. Далаева, перевод с казахского языка С. Бакенова, Ф. Сугирбаева. — История Казахстана. Изд-во «Мектеп», 2006 г. — 240 с

External links
 Genealogy of the Kazakhs 

History of Kazakhstan
Ethnic groups in Kazakhstan